John Brooke England (15 January 1923 – 17 November 1954) was a World War II fighter ace in the American 357th Fighter Group and a career fighter pilot in the United States Air Force.

Early life
He was the son of Bidker H. and Pearl J. England of Caruthersville, Missouri. After graduating from Caruthersville High School on 16 May 1940, he worked as a bookkeeper and later he marketed various agricultural commodities.  Growing up on the banks of the Mississippi River, his favorite hobby was fishing.

World War II
Following the United States entry into World War II, England enlisted in the United States Army on 1 April 1942. He was accepted into aviation cadet training and was sent to Yuma, Arizona, where his flight instructor was future U.S. Senator and presidential candidate Barry Goldwater. He completed his flying training on 9 March 1943. He was then commissioned as a second lieutenant and received his pilot's wings on 10 March 1943.

After this training, he was assigned to the 362d Fighter Squadron of the 357th Fighter Group, which was then flying the P-39 Airacobra. The 357th moved to Santa Rosa, California and then moved for additional training to Oroville, California in August 1943.

The unit was assigned to RAF Leiston and after transitioning to the P-51 Mustang, they flew their first combat mission on 11 February 1944. England was promoted to first lieutenant on 26 October 1943 and by the time he was promoted to captain on 28 April 1944 he already had 6.5 aerial credits. After his first victory on 8 March 1944, he attained the status of "ace" in only forty-eight days.

He took command of the 362d Fighter Squadron on 25 August 1944 and continued as the squadron commander until 8 April 1945. He was promoted to major on 4 December 1944 and continued to fly combat sorties achieving his last aerial victory on 14 January 1945 for a total of 17.5 enemy aircraft destroyed in flight.

Summary of enemy aircraft damaged/destroyed

All information on enemy aircraft damaged and destroyed is from Stars and Bars.

Later career and death
After the war, Major England stayed in the Air Force. By 1949 he was promoted to lieutenant colonel and was given command of the Air Force's cadet training school at Nellis AFB, Nevada.

On 5 June 1949, he married Marilyn Ruth Boswell and they had three children. During this time he formed a flight demonstration team called "The Red Devils", flying World War II-era P-51 Mustangs painted an all-over red. The team was short-lived, because the Mustangs and England were needed for service in Korea.

England served briefly in the Korean War flying six combat missions and on 20 February 1951 he was promoted to lieutenant colonel.
In October 1953, he was assigned to Alexandria Air Force Base in Alexandria, Louisiana as commander of the 389th Fighter-Bomber Squadron where he flew the F-86 Sabre. The squadron deployed to what was then Toul-Rosières Air Base, France in the fall of 1954. From Toul, England flew a mission for gunnery practice near Tripoli, Libya. He was then returning to Toul from Marseille, France, on 17 November 1954. Due to bad weather and low visibility, he made several attempts to land and on his final approach his engine flamed out due to lack of fuel. As he attempted to land without power, he was killed while trying to avoid a barracks building. For this selfless act, Alexandria AFB was renamed England Air Force Base.

He was the leading ace of World War II from Missouri and England City Park in Caruthersville, Missouri has a memorial in his honor. Part of the inscription on the plaque reads "This memorial of Colonel England is dedicated to and represents the highest tradition of American fighting men lost in wars fought for the preservation of our freedoms."

England was buried at Arlington National Cemetery on 30 November 1954.

Awards and decorations
  Command pilot

References

External links
 http://www.acepilots.com/usaaf_eto_aces2.html

1923 births
1954 deaths
United States Army Air Forces pilots of World War II
American World War II flying aces
Aviators from Missouri
Aviators killed in aviation accidents or incidents in France
Burials at Arlington National Cemetery
People from Caruthersville, Missouri
Recipients of the Distinguished Flying Cross (United States)
Recipients of the Silver Star
Recipients of the Air Medal
United States Air Force officers
Victims of aviation accidents or incidents in 1954
American Korean War pilots
United States Air Force personnel of the Korean War
Recipients of the Croix de Guerre 1939–1945 (France)